Kerstin von Lingen (born 1971) is a German military historian who specialises in the study of war crimes.  She is best known for her works on Field Marshal Albert Kesselring and SS Obergruppenfuehrer Karl Wolff.

Biography 
Kerstin von Lingen was in born Bremen in 1971. In 1991, she entered the Albert Ludwig University of Freiburg, where she studied modern history, medieval history and Italian. She then studied history and political science at the University of Milan in 1993–1994. She earned her M.A. at the University of Freiburg, writing a thesis on "Totaler Krieg auf Italienisch? Die deutsche Auslandspropaganda in Italien 1943-1944 ("Total War in Italy? German Propaganda in Italy 1943-1944"). She then wrote her Ph.D. thesis on Britische Kriegsverbrecher und Begnadigungspolitik am Beispiel des Verfahrens gegen Feldmarschall Albert Kesselring in Italien ("British war criminals and pardon policy on the example of the case against Field Marshal Albert Kesselring in Italy") under the supervision of Dieter Langewiesche. This was published in German as Kesselrings letzte Schlacht (2004) and in English as Kesselring's Last Battle (2009). Her rigorosum was on 29 July 2003.

In 2005, von Lingen commenced work on a research project, Immunität durch Kapitulationsverhandlungen: der Fall des SS-Obergruppenführers Karl Wolff ("Immunity Through Surrender Negotiations: the Case of the SS Obergruppenfuehrer Karl Wolff, from which her book SS und Secret Service (2010) was created. This was published in English as Allen Dulles, the OSS, and Nazi War Criminals (2013). From 1999 to 2008 she was a research associate at the Sonderforschungsbereich 437 Kriegserfahrungen (Research School for War and Society in Modern Times) in Tübingen.  From 2006 to 2012 she worked as an expert for the Stuttgart Attorney General in preliminary proceedings on Nazi war crimes in Italy, and taught at the University of Marburg, University of Tübingen and Heidelberg University. She was a Summer School Fellow at the United States Holocaust Memorial Museum in 2006, and a Research Fellow of European Studies at the Research Institute of the University of Salford in 2007. The following year she was accepted as a Fellow in the Royal Historical Society of London. From 2009 to 2011 she was a research associate at the German-Italian Historical Commission.

Lingen was Junior Research Group Leader at the "Asia and Europe in a Global Context" Cluster of Excellence at the University of Heidelberg from 2013 to 2017. Her group worked on "Transcultural Justice: Legal Flows and the Emergence of International Justice in the East Asian War Crimes Trials, 1945–1954." It conducted research on the Allied war crimes trials against members of the Japanese military in the Pacific and the role of the Allies in the Tokyo Tribunal, the Asian equivalent of the Nuremberg Tribunal. During this time Lingen also worked on her habilitation project, "Transnational Debates on the Humanization of War Powers, 1864–1945: an Intellectual History of the Concept of Crimes against Humanity." In 2016, she was awarded the International Chair of the History of the Second World War, an annual lecture prize by the Université Libre de Bruxelles. Her habilitation took place in 2017. That year she was a visiting fellow at the Australian National University and the University of Cambridge.

From 2017 to 2018, Lingen was a visiting professor of Contemporary History (comparative dictatorship, violence and genocide research) at the University of Vienna. In October 2018, she was appointed interim professor at the Department of History at Heidelberg University. In March 2019, Lingen was appointed Professor of Contemporary History (comparative dictatorship, violence and genocide research) at the Department for Contemporary History at the University of Vienna.

Selected bibliography

German

English

External links 
 Website at Heidelberg University

Notes 

1971 births
Living people
Writers from Bremen
University of Freiburg alumni
University of Tübingen alumni
Academic staff of Heidelberg University
German military historians
Fellows of the Royal Historical Society